Maryse Turcotte (born February 23, 1975 in Sherbrooke, Quebec) is a retired female weightlifter from Canada, who competed twice for her native country at the Summer Olympics: 2000 and 2004. A two-time gold medallist at the Commonwealth Games she won a gold medal in the women's – 53 kg division at the 1999 Pan American Games in Winnipeg, Manitoba. She currently works as a physician.

Her sister, Karine Turcotte, is also a weightlifter.

External links

References

1975 births
Commonwealth Games gold medallists for Canada
French Quebecers
Living people
Olympic weightlifters of Canada
Sportspeople from Sherbrooke
Weightlifters at the 2002 Commonwealth Games
Weightlifters at the 2006 Commonwealth Games
Weightlifters at the 1999 Pan American Games
Weightlifters at the 2000 Summer Olympics
Weightlifters at the 2004 Summer Olympics
Canadian female weightlifters
Pan American Games gold medalists for Canada
Commonwealth Games medallists in weightlifting
Pan American Games medalists in weightlifting
Medalists at the 1999 Pan American Games
20th-century Canadian women
21st-century Canadian women
Medallists at the 2002 Commonwealth Games
Medallists at the 2006 Commonwealth Games